Gi Ju-bong (born September 3, 1955) is a South Korean actor.

Career 
Gi began acting in 1977 and is notable for Offending the Audience, Sorum (2001), Viva! Love (2008) and The Spy Gone North (2018).

Filmography

Film

Television series

Theater

Awards and nominations

References

External links 
 
 
 

1955 births
Living people
20th-century South Korean male actors
21st-century South Korean male actors
South Korean male film actors
South Korean male television actors
South Korean male stage actors